Sang Hongyang (c. 152–80 BC) was a Chinese politician. He was a prominent official of the Han Dynasty, who served Emperor Wu of Han and his successor Emperor Zhao. He is famous for his economic policies during the reign of Emperor Wu, the best known of which include the state monopolies over iron and salt - systems which would be imitated by other dynasties throughout Chinese history. Due to political conflict, he was executed in 80 BC by Huo Guang (d. 68 BC).

Sang was one of the participants in the debate of Salt and Iron which took place in 81 BC.

Youth and Officialdom
Sang Hongyang was born in Luoyang, one of the Han Dynasty's major commercial centres, to a family of merchants. In his youth, he was known for his mathematical prowess. When Emperor Wu ascended to the throne in 141 BC, Sang came to his notice and was eventually invited to become an Attendant.  This was one way which the Emperor gained and retained talented individuals in the palace, and by which many important officials began their careers. Sang would remain an Attendant for 26 years.

Rise to Importance
Sang's skill at economic policy would only come into play during the middle of Emperor Wu's reign. By then, the ongoing campaigns against the Xiongnu had drained the wealth built up by Emperor Wu's predecessors, and the state had entered a financial crisis. In 120 BC, the Minister of Agriculture, Zheng Dangshi, first proposed the idea of state monopolies on iron and salt, recommending two powerful salt and iron magnates to join the government and manage the industry on a national scale. Sang Hongyang was then assigned to aid the magnates in their planning. With the success of the monopolies in improving the empire's financial situation, Sang eventually rose to become Assistant Minister of Agriculture.

As the Assistant Minister, Sang soon implemented several more measures to refill the national coffers. These included an asset tax, payable by artisans, bankers, merchants, and owners of carriages and boats, which was calculated according to the amount of assets. Smallholders only needed to pay half the official rate of tax. At the same time, laws were enacted under which false reporting and concealment of assets was punishable by confiscation of assets and exile to the borders for a year. People were encouraged to report cases of concealment with half the confiscated assets being awarded to the reporters.

Imperial Secretary
In 87 BC, Sang Hongyang became the Imperial Secretary (also known as Imperial Counsellor and Grandee Secretary), one of the three most senior posts in government known as the Three Excellencies. In the wake of the death of Emperor Wu and the installation of the child Emperor Zhao of Han in that year, Sang became one of the key politicians during the period of the triumvirate formed by Huo Guang, Jin Midi, and Shangguan Jie. However, Sang was executed in 80 BC by the regent Huo Guang on charges of treason for his alleged involvement in the attempted coup by Liu Dan, King of Yan, aimed at taking over the throne of Han and having Huo Guang murdered. As a result, Sang's biography was not included in the Book of Han.

References

 Loewe, Michael. (1986). "The Former Han Dynasty," in The Cambridge History of China: Volume I: the Ch'in and Han Empires, 221 B.C. – A.D. 220, 103–222. Edited by Denis Twitchett and Michael Loewe. Cambridge: Cambridge University Press. .

150s BC births
80 BC deaths
1st-century BC executions
Executed Han dynasty people
Executed people from Henan
Han dynasty politicians from Henan
People executed by the Han dynasty
Politicians from Luoyang
Chinese reformers